Cui Yongzhe (born 8 January 1987 in Yanji) is a Chinese footballer of Korean descent.

Club career
Cui Yongzhe was promoted to Yanbian Changbaishan's first team squad in 2004.  In February 2009, Cui transferred to China League One side Anhui Jiufang. Cui returned to Yanbian FC in January 2011.

On 21 January 2013, Cui moved to China League One side Chongqing Lifan. He made his Super League debut on 14 March 2015, in the second match of the season against Guangzhou Evergrande, coming on as a substitute for Wang Dong.

Career statistics 
Statistics accurate as of match played 31 December 2019.

Honours

Club
Chongqing Lifan
China League One: 2014

References

External links
 

1987 births
Living people
People from Yanbian
Chinese footballers
Footballers from Jilin
Chinese people of Korean descent
Yanbian Funde F.C. players
Anhui Jiufang players
Chongqing Liangjiang Athletic F.C. players
Chinese Super League players
China League One players
China League Two players
Association football midfielders